Montrose Burghs was a district of burghs constituency represented in the House of Commons of the Parliament of the United Kingdom from 1832 until 1950.

The constituency elected one Member of Parliament (MP) to represent the parliamentary burghs of Montrose, Arbroath, Brechin, Forfar and Inverbervie.

In 1950, Montrose, Brechin and Inverbervie were merged into North Angus and Mearns, and Arbroath and Forfar were merged into South Angus.

Members of Parliament

Elections

Elections in the 1830s

Elections in the 1840s

Chalmers resigned by accepting the office of Steward of the Manor of Northstead, causing a by-election.

Elections in the 1850s

Hume's death caused a by-election.

Elections in the 1860s

Elections in the 1870s

Elections in the 1880s

Elections in the 1890s

Elections in the 1900s

Elections in the 1910s 

General Election 1914–15:

Another General Election was required to take place before the end of 1915. The political parties had been making preparations for an election to take place and by the July 1914, the following candidates had been selected; 
Liberal: Robert Harcourt
Unionist: John Hossell Henderson
Labour: James Maxton

Elections in the 1920s

Elections in the 1930s 

General Election 1939–40

Another General Election was required to take place before the end of 1940. The political parties had been making preparations for an election to take place and by the Autumn of 1939, the following candidates had been selected; 
Liberal National: John Maclay
Labour: Olive R Crutchley

Elections in the 1940s

References 

Debrett's House of Commons and Judicial Bench, 1889

Historic parliamentary constituencies in Scotland (Westminster)
Constituencies of the Parliament of the United Kingdom established in 1832
Constituencies of the Parliament of the United Kingdom disestablished in 1950
Politics of Angus, Scotland